Trichosanthes dioica Roxb., also known as pointed gourd, is a tropical perennial cucurbit plant with its origin in the Indian subcontinent. It is also known as parwal, palwal, potol, or parmalin in different parts of India and Bangladesh. The plant propagated vegetatively and grows with training on a support system (e.g., trellis) as pencil-thick vines (creepers) with dark-green cordate (heart-shaped) simple leaves. It is a well-developed dioecious plants having distinct male and female flowers on staminate and pistillate plants, respectively. The fruits are green with white or no stripes' and have unpalatable seeds. Size can vary from small and round to thick and long — 2 to 6 inches (5 to 15 cm). It thrives well under a hot to moderately warm and humid climate. The plant remains dormant during the winter season and prefers fertile, well-drained sandy loam soil due to its susceptibility to water-logging.

India
Colloquially, in India, it is called  or green potato. It is widely cultivated in the eastern and some northern parts of India, particularly in Northeastern Andhra, Odisha, Bengal, Assam, Bihar, and Uttar Pradesh. Parval is also used to make , a deep fried cuisine filled with spices.

Bangladesh and West Bengal

Pointed gourd is provincially known as potol in both of these Bengali-speaking regions. It is a vital summer vegetable in Bangladesh and in West Bengal. It is cultivated and consumed in every part of Bangladesh and West Bengal. It is a perennial crop and sold at the end of October when there is a shortage of other alternative vegetables.

Nutrients
Almost every part of T. dioica is being used in the indigenous system
of medicine. The fruit constituents are minerals (Magnesium, Sodium,
Potassium, Copper, and Sulphur), vitamins, tannins, saponins, alkaloids,
glycosides, flavonoids, steroids, pentacyclic triterpenes, and other
bioactive compounds have proven that the pointed gourd promising. 

Pointed gourd is a good source of vitamins and minerals. It is a good source of carbohydrates, vitamin A, and vitamin C. It also contains major nutrients and trace elements (magnesium, potassium, copper, sulfur, and chlorine) which are needed in small quantities, for playing essential roles in human physiology.  9.0 mg Mg, 2.6 mg Na, 83.0 mg K, 1.1 mg Cu and 17 mg S per 100 g edible part.

In human culture

The fifteenth-century Hatha Yoga Pradipika 1.61-65 recommends Parwal as one of the foods suitable for yogins.

See also
Gourd

References

External links
Article about parwal from Fort Valley State University College of Agriculture

dioica
Flora of the Indian subcontinent
Flora of Myanmar
Fruit vegetables
Dioecious plants